Tristichotrochus aculeatus, common name the prickly Japanese top shell, is a species of medium-sized deepwater sea snail, a marine gastropod mollusk in the subfamily Calliostomatinae of the family Calliostomatidae.

Subspecies
 Tristichotrochus aculeatus aculeatus (G. B. Sowerby III, 1912)
 Tristichotrochus aculeatus aliguayensis (Poppe, Tagaro & Dekker, 2006)

Shell description
The shell is conical, with straight spire outlines, and six whorls. The external shell coloration is light brown, with darker brown irregular flecks. The shell height is up to 22 mm, and the width is up to 15 mm.

Distribution
This marine species lives off the Philippines. It is found off Aliguay Island, Mindanao. It lives at depths of about 100 m on muddy sand bottoms. It also occurs off southern Japan and Taiwan.

References

 Petit R.E. (2009) George Brettingham Sowerby, I, II & III: their conchological publications and molluscan taxa. Zootaxa 2189: 1–218
 Bouchet, P.; Fontaine, B. (2009). List of new marine species described between 2002-2006. Census of Marine Life.
 Poppe, Guido T. (guido@conchology.be); Tagaro, Sheila P.; Dekker, Henk. 2006. Visaya Supplement: Supplement 2 Pages: 3-228

External links
 

aculeatus
Gastropods described in 1912